Robinsonekspedisjonen Vinter, is the twelfth season of the Norwegian version of the Swedish show Expedition Robinson and the first season of Robinsonekspedisjonen to take place in a cold climate. This season premiered on March 11, 2012 and finished in late May. The main twist this season is that the contestants live in the cold climate of Rauland, Norway.

In episode 6 Lucas called his girlfriend (Nora Lindvåg Johre) a paradise hotel reality star,
and lost his immunity as he broke the rule of 
communicating with the outside world when he used a cellphone.

Finishing order

The game

:Following their victory at the fifth reward challenge, the South team was allowed to choose one person that would join them on their reward.
:At the fifth tribal immunity challenge two idols were placed in the center of the challenge area. The player from the losing tribe that grabbed their idol first would be immune at the fifth tribal council.
:Prior to the merge in episode 6, both tribes were asked to choose one person that would not make the merge. The North team chose Lucas while the South picked Lasse. The two men were then asked to pick one other person from their tribe that would also fall short of the merge. Ultimately, Lucas picked Edwin while Lasse picked Robert. The four men were then forced to pick one of them that would take part in a duel against someone from the merge tribe, someone who would automatically join the merge tribe and have immunity at the first tribal council, and two people that would be eliminated regardless of the duel's outcome. Lucas was picked to join the Robinson tribe, Lasse was picked to duel, and Edwin and Robert were picked to be eliminated. Lasse then chose Erik to face him in the duel.
:At the sixth tribal council, Lucas lost his immunity as he broke the rule of communicating with the outside world when he used a cellphone to make a personal call.

Voting History

 As he had grabbed his tribes immunity idol at the fifth immunity challenge, Ørjan was immune at the fifth tribal council.
 Prior to the merge in episode 6, both tribes were asked to choose one person that would not make the merge. The North team chose Lucas while the South picked Lasse. The two men were then asked to pick one other person from their tribe that would also fall short of the merge. Ultimately, Lucas picked Edwin while Lasse picked Robert. The four men were then forced to pick one of them that would take part in a duel against someone from the merge tribe, someone who would automatically join the merge tribe and have immunity at the first tribal council, and two people that would be eliminated regardless of the duel's outcome. Lucas was picked to join the Robinson tribe, Lasse was picked to duel, and Edwin and Robert were picked to be eliminated. Lasse then chose Erik to face him in the duel.
 At the sixth tribal council, Lucas lost his immunity as he broke the rule of communicating with the outside world when he used a cellphone to make a personal call.

Reference List

External links
(Official Site)

 2012
2012 Norwegian television seasons